SMSS J215728.21-360215.1, commonly known as J2157-3602, is one of the fastest growing black holes and one of the most powerful quasars known to exist . It was discovered with the SkyMapper telescope at Australian National University's Siding Spring Observatory, announced in May 2018.

In July 2020 the black hole associated with the quasar was reported to be 34 billion solar masses, based on a study published in Monthly Notices of the Royal Astronomical Society.

References 

Quasars
Supermassive black holes
Piscis Austrinus